The U.S. state of Nebraska is divided into 93 counties, 25 of which are divided into a total of 460 townships.  63 are divided into precincts where there is no township government. Four counties have neither a township nor a precinct subdivision: Banner, Hooker, Thomas, and Arthur. Thomas County was still subdivided into three precincts as of the Census 2000. Townships and precinct as county subdivisions are listed in a 1970 census document.

See also
 Nebraska
 List of cities in Nebraska
 List of counties in Nebraska

References

External links
 Census 2000 Gazetteer
 National Association of Towns and Townships

 
Townships
Nebraska